In Major League Baseball (MLB), the Pitcher of the Month Award is given monthly during the regular season to two outstanding pitchers, one each in the National League (NL) and American League (AL). Upon the introduction of each league's pitcher award, pitchers became ineligible for the position players' monthly award.

Awards by month
Players listed with multiple occurrences are denoted by parentheses containing the ordinal.

The most Pitcher of the Month awards won by a single player is 15 by Roger Clemens.  He is followed by Greg Maddux (10), Pedro Martínez (8), Randy Johnson (8), and Johan Santana (8).

Source:

See also

List of MLB awards

References

Pitcher

Awards established in 1975